Pseudopharus is a genus of moths in the family Erebidae. The genus was erected by George Hampson in 1901.

Species
Pseudopharus amata (Druce, 1900)
Pseudopharus cornelia (Druce, 1906)
Pseudopharus domingona (Druce, 1906)
Pseudopharus hades Dognin, 1909
Pseudopharus gibeauxi Toulgoët, 1990
Pseudopharus nigra (Schaus, 1904)

References

External links

Phaegopterina
Moth genera